Nepotula is a genus of moth in the family Cosmopterigidae. It contains only one species, Nepotula secura, which is found in North America, where it has been recorded from Florida and South Carolina.

References

Natural History Museum Lepidoptera genus database

Chrysopeleiinae
Monotypic moth genera